The England national football team represents the country of England in international association football. It is fielded by The Football Association, the governing body of football in England, and competes as a member of the Union of European Football Associations (UEFA), which encompasses the countries of Europe. England competed in the first official international football match on 30 November 1872, a 0–0 draw with Scotland at Hamilton Crescent.

England have competed in numerous competitions, and all players who have played in 10 or more matches, either as a member of the starting eleven or as a substitute, are listed below. Each player's details include his playing position while with the team, the number of caps earned and goals scored in all international matches, and details of the first and most recent matches played in. The names are initially ordered by number of caps (in descending order), then by date of debut, then by alphabetical order. All statistics are correct up to and including the match played on 10 December 2022.

Introduction
The first player to be capped 10 times by England was Norman Bailey, who played his 10th match in an 8–1 away win against Ireland on 23 February 1884 in the 1883–84 British Home Championship. His final match, in which he earned his 19th cap, was the 3–1 home defeat to Scotland on 19 March 1887. The appearance record is held by goalkeeper Peter Shilton, which he set on 7 June 1989 in a 1–1 away draw with Denmark in a friendly. Shilton's last match for England was the third-place match against Italy on 7 July 1990 in the World Cup. He finished his England career on 125 caps.

The goalscoring record is shared by Wayne Rooney, with 53 goals in 120 matches between 2003 and 2018, and Harry Kane, with 53 goals from 80 matches between 2015 and 2022. Rooney passed Bobby Charlton's record of 49 goals, which had stood for 45 years, with his 50th goal on 8 September 2015, in a 2–0 home win over Switzerland in a European Championship qualifier. On 10 December 2022, Kane equalled Rooney's total of 53 goals in the World Cup quarter-finals against France. Although Rooney is officially credited with 53 goals for England, some sources cite his total as 52, with one of the official total credited as an own goal.

England's highest scorer in World Cup finals matches is Gary Lineker, with ten goals, and the highest scorer in European Championship finals matches is Alan Shearer, with seven goals.

Key

Players

See also
List of England international footballers with one cap
List of England international footballers (2–3 caps)
List of England international footballers (4–9 caps)
List of England national football team World Cup and European Championship squads
List of England national football team captains

References

 
Association football player non-biographical articles